Komapuram  is a village in the Gandaravakottairevenue block of  
Pudukkottai district,  
Tamil Nadu, India.

Demographics 

As per the 2001 census, Komapuram had a total population of 2043 with 1064 males and 979 females. Out of the total  
population 1100 people were literate.

References

Villages in Pudukkottai district